The MS Stalowa Wola, ex Henry Horn, ex Pine Court, ex Rio Pardo, was a Polish freighter during the Second World War.  The ship was bought in Norway by Gdynia America Line; originally she was to be called Bogumin, finally was named after a city in central Poland, by then a newly built centre of heavy industry.

Capitulation of France found the ship in Dakar. Commanded by captain Strzembosz, she escaped on July 5th 1940, although challenged by the shore defences. Afterwards, till the end of World War II Stalowa Wola participated in over 40 Atlantic convoys. Returned to Poland after the end of the war, the ship ran on lines to South America and Levant, and then was used as a tramper.

The ship sunk on 19 March 1956 during a violent storm off the coast of Spain. On March 18th Stalowa Wola sprung a leak and the load of iron ore she carried, turned into sludge, which movements were impossible to balance using the tanks.

References

World War II merchant ships of Poland
1924 ships
Ships of the Gdynia-America Line